Eexterveen is a village in the Dutch province of Drenthe. It is a part of the municipality of Aa en Hunze, and lies about 17 km east of Assen.

History 
The village was first mentioned in 1479 as Egesteruene, and means "raised bog belonging to Eext". Eexterveen developed during the 19th century as a peat excavation village.

Eexterveen was home to 187 people in 1840.

Transportation
There is no railway station here. The nearest station is Assen station. Bus service 93 stops in the town.
For further information see Aa en Hunze#Transportation.

References

Populated places in Drenthe
Aa en Hunze